Porte de Charenton is a station on Line 8 of the Paris Métro.

The station opened on 5 May 1931 with the extension of the line from Richelieu–Drouot for the Paris Colonial Exposition, held in the nearby Bois de Vincennes. It was the southeastern terminus of the line until its extension to Charenton–Écoles on 5 October 1942. It is named after the Porte de Charenton, a gate in the 19th-century Thiers wall of Paris on the road to Charenton-le-Pont.

An interchange with Île-de-France tramway Line 3a opened on 15 December 2012.

The nearby Pelouse de Reuilly (part of the Bois de Vincennes) is the location of the Foire du Trône funfair in April and May.

Station layout

Gallery

References
Roland, Gérard (2003). Stations de métro. D’Abbesses à Wagram. Éditions Bonneton.

Paris Métro stations in the 12th arrondissement of Paris
Railway stations in France opened in 1931
Paris Colonial Exposition